Elton D. Aberle is an American animal scientist. He was born and raised on a small farm in Sabetha, Kansas. He earned a BS degree in animal husbandry from the Kansas State University, and MS and PhD degrees in Food Science/Meat Science at Michigan State University. After his graduate work he became a professor in the Department of Animal Sciences at Purdue University. In 1983, he became chair of the Animal Sciences Department at University of Nebraska–Lincoln, where he continued to work as a professor. In 1998, he joined the faculty of University of Wisconsin, where he was named Dean of the College of Agricultural and Life Sciences. He retired from this position in 2005. He was Elected as Fellow to the American Association for the Advancement of Science in 2001. In May 2018, he was inducted into the Wisconsin Meat Industry Hall of Fame.

Selected publications 
 Principles of Meat Science, with John C. Forrest (2001)

References

Fellows of the American Association for the Advancement of Science
University of Wisconsin–Madison faculty
Living people
American scientists
Year of birth missing (living people)